Adam Ivy House is a historic home located near Van Wyck, Lancaster County, South Carolina. It was built about 1849–1850, and is a two-story, vernacular Greek Revival style frame dwelling. It has a full-width, one-story front porch. Additions and renovations took place around 1920. Also on the property are two contributing outbuildings; large and small barns located near the house.

It was added to the National Register of Historic Places in 1990.

References

Houses on the National Register of Historic Places in South Carolina
Houses completed in 1850
Greek Revival houses in South Carolina
Houses in Lancaster County, South Carolina
National Register of Historic Places in Lancaster County, South Carolina